Rastislav Tomovčík (born 12 April 1973 in Michalovce) is a retired Slovak football midfielder who currently works as a head manager of ŠK Strážske.

References

External links

1973 births
Living people
Slovak footballers
Association football midfielders
MFK Zemplín Michalovce players
ŠK Futura Humenné players
FC Spartak Trnava players
FC VSS Košice players
FK Inter Bratislava players
MFK Ružomberok players
ŠK Slovan Bratislava players
Slovak Super Liga players
People from Michalovce
Sportspeople from the Košice Region